Melody Ranch is a 1940 Western musical film directed by Joseph Santley and starring Gene Autry, Jimmy Durante, and Ann Miller. Written by Jack Moffitt, F. Hugh Herbert, Bradford Ropes, and Betty Burbridge, the film is about a singing cowboy who returns to his hometown to restore order when his former childhood enemies take over the frontier town. In 2002, the film was added to the National Film Registry by the National Film Preservation Board and selected for preservation as being "culturally, historically, or aesthetically significant."

Plot
Gene Autry (Gene Autry) returns to his hometown of Torpedo as guest of honor at the Frontier Days Celebration, where he meets his childhood enemies, the Wildhack brothers—Mark (Barton MacLane), Jasper (Joe Sawyer), and Bud (Horace McMahon)—who are now local gangsters. The Wildhacks own a saloon next door to the school, and when their shooting and brawling endangers the safety of the children, Gene protests and threatens to expose them during his next radio broadcast. The Wildhacks stop the broadcast and beat Gene up.

Realizing that Hollywood life has softened him to the extent that he can't hold his own against three assailants, Gene decides to remain in Torpedo and get into shape again. He is encouraged by his friend Cornelius J. "Corney" Courtney (Jimmy Durante) and Pop Laramie (George "Gabby" Hayes). Refusing to return to Hollywood, Gene now broadcasts his radio shows from Torpedo.

Julie Sheldon (Ann Miller), a debutante with theatrical aspirations, sees Gene in his natural setting and begins to take an interest in the cowboy she formerly scorned. Meanwhile, Gene rounds up the Wildhacks and fights them single-handed, forcing them to sing on his broadcast. When the brothers become determined to get revenge, Gene runs for sheriff so he will be in position to clean up the Wildhack political machine for good, and also make use of the "Vote for Autry" song. During the battles that ensue, one of Gene's friends is killed. Gene discovers evidence that identifies the Wildhacks as the killers.

Cast

Production

Casting
Melody Ranch marks the first romantic leading lady role for dancer Ann Miller. In one love scene Miller and Autry kiss. Negative advance publicity, however, led Republic Pictures to cut the kiss from the final print. Autry later recalled, 
 Miller would later claim incorrectly that she received Gene's first screen kiss, a distinction that belongs to Barbara Pepper and Ann Rutherford.

Filming and budget
Melody Ranch was filmed September 16 to October 5, 1940. The film had an operating budget of $181,275 (equal to $ today), and a negative cost of $177,520.

Stuntwork
 Yakima Canutt
 Wally West
 Joe Yrigoyen (Gene Autry's stunt double)

Filming locations
 Alabama Hills, Lone Pine, California, USA 
 Mammoth Lakes, California, USA 
 Red Rock Canyon State Park, Highway 14, Cantil, California, USA 
 Republic Studios, 4024 Radford Avenue, North Hollywood, Los Angeles, California, USA

Soundtracks
 "Stake Your Claim on Melody Ranch" (Jule Styne, Eddie Cherkose) by Gene Autry and cowboys
 "Stake Your Claim on Melody Ranch" (reprise) by Gene Autry and Ann Miller
 "Rodeo Rose" (Jule Styne, Eddie Cherkose) by Gene Autry and musicians
 "Jeanie With the Light Brown Hair" (Stephen Foster)
 "Welcome Home" by the children
 "Torpedo Joe" (Jule Styne, Eddie Cherkose) by Mary Lee with piano accompaniment
 "We Never Dream the Same Dream Twice" (Gene Autry, Fred Rose) by Gene Autry and Ann Miller
 "My Gal Sal" (Paul Dresser) by Ann Miller (vocals and tap dance) and male chorus
 "William Tell Overture" (Gioachino Rossini)
 "Back to the City Again" (Ray Whitley, Jule Styne, Eddie Cherkose) by Joe Sawyer and Horace McMahon
 "Call of the Canyon" (Billy Hill) by Gene Autry
 "What Are Cowboys Made Of" (Jule Styne, Eddie Cherkose) by Joe Sawyer and Horace McMahon
 "Vote for Autry" (Jule Styne, Eddie Cherkose) by Jimmy Durante and Mary Lee
 "Silver Threads Among the Gold" (H.P. Danks, Eben E. Rexford) by Barbara Jo Allen (a cappella)

Melody Ranch Motion Picture Studio
In 1953, Gene Autry purchased the  movie ranch, the Monogram Pictures Ranch property in Placerita Canyon State Park near Newhall, California and renamed it the Melody Ranch after this film.

References
Citations

Bibliography

External links
 
 
 
 Melody Ranch Information
 Melody Ranch Motion Picture Studio

1940 films
1940s Western (genre) musical films
American Western (genre) musical films
Republic Pictures films
American black-and-white films
1940s English-language films
Films directed by Joseph Santley
Films shot in Lone Pine, California
United States National Film Registry films
Films produced by Sol C. Siegel
Films scored by Raoul Kraushaar
Films with screenplays by F. Hugh Herbert
1940s American films